The Malpighiales comprise one of the largest orders of flowering plants, containing about 36 families and more than  species, about 7.8% of the eudicots. The order is very diverse, containing plants as different as the willow, violet, poinsettia, manchineel, rafflesia and coca plant, and are hard to recognize except with molecular phylogenetic evidence. It is not part of any of the classification systems based only on plant morphology. Molecular clock calculations estimate the origin of stem group Malpighiales at around 100 million years ago (Mya) and the origin of crown group Malpighiales at about 90 Mya.

The anthophytes are a grouping of plant taxa bearing flower-like reproductive structures. They were formerly thought to be a clade comprising plants bearing flower-like structures.  The group contained the angiosperms - the extant flowering plants, such as roses and grasses - as well as the Gnetales and the extinct Bennettitales.

23,420 species of vascular plant have been recorded in South Africa, making it the sixth most species-rich country in the world and the most species-rich country on the African continent. Of these, 153 species are considered to be threatened. Nine biomes have been described in South Africa: Fynbos, Succulent Karoo, desert, Nama Karoo, grassland, savanna, Albany thickets, the Indian Ocean coastal belt, and forests.

The 2018 South African National Biodiversity Institute's National Biodiversity Assessment plant checklist lists 35,130 taxa in the phyla Anthocerotophyta (hornworts (6)), Anthophyta (flowering plants (33534)), Bryophyta (mosses (685)), Cycadophyta (cycads (42)), Lycopodiophyta (Lycophytes(45)), Marchantiophyta (liverworts (376)), Pinophyta (conifers (33)), and Pteridophyta (cryptogams (408)).

20 families are represented in the literature. Listed taxa include species, subspecies, varieties, and forms as recorded, some of which have subsequently been allocated to other taxa as synonyms, in which cases the accepted taxon is appended to the listing. Multiple entries under alternative names reflect taxonomic revision over time.

Achariaceae
Family: Achariaceae,

Acharia
Genus Acharia:
 Acharia tragodes Thunb. endemic

Ceratiosicyos
Genus Ceratiosicyos:
 Ceratiosicyos laevis (Thunb.) A.Meeuse, indigenous

Guthriea
Genus Guthriea:
 Guthriea capensis Bolus, indigenous

Kiggelaria
Genus Kiggelaria:
 Kiggelaria africana L. indigenous

Rawsonia
Genus Rawsonia:
 Rawsonia lucida Harv. & Sond. indigenous

Xylotheca
Genus Xylotheca:
 Xylotheca kraussiana Hochst. indigenous

Chrysobalanaceae
Family: Chrysobalanaceae,

Parinari
Genus Parinari: 
 Parinari capensis Harv. indigenous
 Parinari capensis Harv. subsp. capensis, indigenous
 Parinari capensis Harv. subsp. incohata F.White, indigenous
 Parinari curatellifolia Planch. ex Benth. indigenous

Clusiaceae
Family: Clusiaceae,

Clusia
Genus Clusia: 
 Clusia rosea Jacq. not indigenous, cultivated, naturalised, invasive

Garcinia
Genus Garcinia:
 Garcinia gerrardii Harv. ex Sim, indigenous
 Garcinia livingstonei T.Anderson, indigenous

Dichapetalaceae
Family: Dichapetalaceae,

Dichapetalum
Genus Dichapetalum: 
 Dichapetalum cymosum (Hook.) Engl. indigenous

Tapura
Genus Tapura: 
 Tapura fischeri Engl. indigenous

Elatinaceae
Family: Elatinaceae,

Bergia
Genus Bergia: 
 Bergia anagalloides E.Mey. ex Fenzl, indigenous
 Bergia capensis L. indigenous
 Bergia decumbens Planch. ex Harv. indigenous
 Bergia glomerata L.f. endemic
 Bergia pentheriana Keissl. indigenous
 Bergia polyantha Sond. indigenous
 Bergia salaria Bremek. indigenous

Elatine
Genus Elatine:
 Elatine ambigua Wight, indigenous
 Elatine triandra Schkuhr, indigenous

Erythroxylaceae
Family: Erythroxylaceae,

Erythroxylum
Genus Erythroxylum: 
 Erythroxylum delagoense Schinz, indigenous
 Erythroxylum emarginatum Thonn. indigenous
 Erythroxylum pictum E.Mey. ex Sond. endemic

Nectaropetalum
Genus Nectaropetalum:
 Nectaropetalum capense (Bolus) Stapf & Boodle, endemic
 Nectaropetalum zuluense (Schonland) Corbishley, endemic

Euphorbiaceae

Family: Euphorbiaceae, 47 genera have been recorded. Not all are necessarily currently accepted.

 Genus Acalypha:
 Genus Adenocline:
 Genus Alchornea:
 Genus Aleurites:
 Genus Anisophyllum:
 Genus Anthacantha:
 Genus Arthrothamnus:
 Genus Breynia:
 Genus Caperonia:
 Genus Cavacoa
 Genus Cephalocroton:
 Genus Chamaesyce:
 Genus Chrozophora:
 Genus Clutia:
 Genus Croton:
 Genus Ctenomeria:
 Genus Dactylanthes:
 Genus Dalechampia:
 Genus Erythrococca:
 Genus Euphorbia:
 Genus Excoecaria:
 Genus Galarhoeus:
 Genus Homalanthus:
 Genus Jatropha:
 Genus Leidesia:
 Genus Macaranga:
 Genus Manihot:
 Genus Medusea:
 Genus Mercurialis:
 Genus Micrococca:
 Genus Monadenium:
 Genus Pedilanthus:
 Genus Pterococcus:
 Genus Ricinus:
 Genus Sapium:
 Genus Schinziophyton:
 Genus Sclerocroton:
 Genus Seidelia:
 Genus Shirakiopsis:
 Genus Spirostachys:
 Genus Suregada:
 Genus Synadenium:
 Genus Tithymalus:
 Genus Tragia:
 Genus Tragiella:
 Genus Treisia:
 Genus Vernicia:

Hypericaceae
Family: Hypericaceae,

Hypericum
Genus Hypericum: 
 Hypericum aethiopicum Thunb. indigenous
 Hypericum aethiopicum Thunb. subsp. aethiopicum, indigenous
 Hypericum aethiopicum Thunb. subsp. sonderi (Bredell) N.Robson, indigenous
 Hypericum androsaemum L. not indigenous, naturalised, invasive
 Hypericum canariense L. not indigenous, cultivated, naturalised, invasive
 Hypericum forrestii (Chitt.) N.Robson, not indigenous, naturalised
 Hypericum hookerianum Wight & Arn. not indigenous, naturalised
 Hypericum lalandii Choisy, indigenous
 Hypericum natalense J.M.Wood & M.S.Evans, indigenous
 Hypericum perforatum L. not indigenous, naturalised, invasive
 Hypericum pseudohenryi N.Robson, not indigenous, naturalised, invasive
 Hypericum revolutum Vahl, indigenous
 Hypericum revolutum Vahl subsp. revolutum, indigenous
 Hypericum roeperianum G.W.Schimp. ex A.Rich. indigenous
 Hypericum roeperianum G.W.Schimp. ex A.Rich. var. roeperianum, indigenous
 Hypericum wilmsii R.Keller, indigenous

Linaceae
Family: Linaceae,

Hugonia
Genus Hugonia: 
 Hugonia orientalis Engl. indigenous

Linum
Genus Linum: 
 Linum acuticarpum C.M.Rogers, endemic
 Linum adustum E.Mey. ex Planch. endemic
 Linum aethiopicum Thunb. endemic
 Linum africanum L. endemic
 Linum brevistylum C.M.Rogers, endemic
 Linum comptonii C.M.Rogers, endemic
 Linum esterhuyseniae C.M.Rogers, endemic
 Linum gracile Planch. endemic
 Linum heterostylum C.M.Rogers, endemic
 Linum pungens Planch. endemic
 Linum quadrifolium L. endemic
 Linum thesioides Bartl. endemic
 Linum thunbergii Eckl. & Zeyh. indigenous
 Linum usitatissimum L. not indigenous, cultivated, naturalised
 Linum villosum C.M.Rogers, endemic

Malpighiaceae
Family: Malpighiaceae,

Acridocarpus
Genus Acridocarpus:
 Acridocarpus natalitius A.Juss. indigenous
 Acridocarpus natalitius A.Juss. var. linearifolius Launert, indigenous
 Acridocarpus natalitius A.Juss. var. natalitius, indigenous

Sphedamnocarpus
Genus Sphedamnocarpus:
 Sphedamnocarpus pruriens (A.Juss.) Szyszyl. indigenous
 Sphedamnocarpus pruriens (A.Juss.) Szyszyl. subsp. galphimiifolius (A.Juss.) P.D.de Villiers & D.J.B, indigenous
 Sphedamnocarpus pruriens (A.Juss.) Szyszyl. subsp. pruriens, indigenous
 Sphedamnocarpus transvalicus (Kuntze) Burtt Davy, accepted as Sphedamnocarpus pruriens (A.Juss.) Szyszyl. subsp. galphimiifolius (A.Juss.) P.D.de Villiers & D.J.B, present

Triaspis
Genus Triaspis:
 Triaspis glaucophylla Engl. endemic
 Triaspis hypericoides (DC.) Burch. indigenous
 Triaspis hypericoides (DC.) Burch. subsp. canescens (Engl.) Immelman, indigenous
 Triaspis hypericoides (DC.) Burch. subsp. hypericoides, indigenous
 Triaspis hypericoides (DC.) Burch. subsp. nelsonii (Oliv.) Immelman, indigenous

Ochnaceae
Family: Ochnaceae,

Brackenridgea
Genus Brackenridgea:
 Brackenridgea zanguebarica Oliv. indigenous

Ochna
Genus Ochna:
 Ochna arborea Burch. ex DC. indigenous
 Ochna arborea Burch. ex DC. var. arborea, indigenous
 Ochna arborea Burch. ex DC. var. oconnorii (E.Phillips) Du Toit, indigenous
 Ochna barbosae N.Robson, indigenous
 Ochna confusa Burtt Davy & Greenway, indigenous
 Ochna gamostigmata du Toit, indigenous
 Ochna glauca I.Verd. indigenous
 Ochna holstii Engl. indigenous
 Ochna inermis (Forssk.) Schweinf. indigenous
 Ochna natalitia (Meisn.) Walp. indigenous
 Ochna pretoriensis E.Phillips, indigenous
 Ochna pulchra Hook.f. indigenous
 Ochna serrulata (Hochst.) Walp. indigenous

Passifloraceae
Family: Passifloraceae,

Adenia
Genus Adenia:
 Adenia digitata (Harv.) Engl. indigenous
 Adenia fruticosa Burtt Davy, indigenous
 Adenia fruticosa Burtt Davy subsp. fruticosa, endemic
 Adenia fruticosa Burtt Davy subsp. simplicifolia W.J.de Wilde, indigenous
 Adenia fruticosa Burtt Davy subsp. trifoliata W.J.de Wilde, endemic
 Adenia glauca Schinz, indigenous
 Adenia gummifera (Harv.) Harms, indigenous
 Adenia gummifera (Harv.) Harms var. gummifera, indigenous
 Adenia hastata (Harv.) Schinz, indigenous
 Adenia hastata (Harv.) Schinz var. glandulifera W.J.de Wilde, indigenous
 Adenia hastata (Harv.) Schinz var. hastata, indigenous
 Adenia natalensis W.J.de Wilde, endemic
 Adenia repanda (Burch.) Engl. indigenous
 Adenia spinosa Burtt Davy, indigenous
 Adenia wilmsii Harms, endemic

Basananthe
Genus Basananthe:
 Basananthe pedata (Baker f.) W.J.de Wilde, indigenous
 Basananthe polygaloides (Hutch. & K.Pearce) W.J.de Wilde, endemic
 Basananthe sandersonii (Harv.) W.J.de Wilde, indigenous
 Basananthe triloba (Bolus) W.J.de Wilde, indigenous

Paropsia
Genus Paropsia:
 Paropsia braunii Gilg, indigenous

Passiflora
Genus Passiflora:
 Passiflora caerulea L. not indigenous, naturalised, invasive
 Passiflora edulis Sims, not indigenous, naturalised, invasive
 Passiflora foetida L. not indigenous, naturalised
 Passiflora manicata (Juss.) Pers. not indigenous, naturalised
 Passiflora mollissima (Kunth) L.H.Bailey, accepted as Passiflora tripartita Breiter var. mollissima (Kunth) Holm-Niels. & P.Jorg. not indigenous, naturalised
 Passiflora suberosa L. not indigenous, naturalised, invasive
 Passiflora subpeltata Ortega, not indigenous, naturalised, invasive
 Passiflora tripartita Breiter var. mollissima (Kunth) Holm-Niels. & P.Jorg. not indigenous, naturalised, invasive

Schlechterina
Genus Schlechterina:
 Schlechterina mitostemmatoides Harms, indigenous

Phyllanthaceae
Family: Phyllanthaceae,

Andrachne
Genus Andrachne:
 Andrachne ovalis (E.Mey. ex Sond.) Mull.Arg. indigenous

Antidesma
Genus Antidesma:
 Antidesma venosum E.Mey. ex Tul. indigenous

Bridelia
Genus Bridelia:
 Bridelia cathartica G.Bertol. indigenous
 Bridelia cathartica G.Bertol. subsp. cathartica, indigenous
 Bridelia cathartica G.Bertol. var. melanthesoides forma melanthesoides, indigenous
 Bridelia micrantha (Hochst.) Baill. indigenous
 Bridelia mollis Hutch. indigenous

Cleistanthus
Genus Cleistanthus:
 Cleistanthus schlechteri (Pax) Hutch. indigenous
 Cleistanthus schlechteri (Pax) Hutch. var. schlechteri, indigenous

Flueggea
Genus Flueggea:
 Flueggea verrucosa (Thunb.) G.L.Webster, endemic
 Flueggea virosa (Roxb. ex Willd.) Voigt, indigenous
 Flueggea virosa (Roxb. ex Willd.) Voigt subsp. virosa, indigenous

Heywoodia
Genus Heywoodia:
 Heywoodia lucens Sim, indigenous

Hymenocardia
Genus Hymenocardia:
 Hymenocardia ulmoides Oliv. indigenous
 Hymenocardia ulmoides Oliv. var. capensis Pax, accepted as Hymenocardia ulmoides Oliv. indigenous

Lachnostylis
Genus Lachnostylis:
 Lachnostylis bilocularis R.A.Dyer, endemic
 Lachnostylis hanekomii R.H.Archer & J.C.Manning, endemic
 Lachnostylis hirta (L.f.) Mull.Arg. endemic

Margaritaria
Genus Margaritaria:
 Margaritaria discoidea (Baill.) G.L.Webster, indigenous
 Margaritaria discoidea (Baill.) G.L.Webster var. fagifolia (Pax) Radcl.-Sm. indigenous
 Margaritaria discoidea (Baill.) G.L.Webster var. nitida (Pax) Radcl.-Sm. indigenous

Phyllanthus
Genus Phyllanthus:
 Phyllanthus asperulatus Hutch. indigenous
 Phyllanthus burchellii Mull.Arg. accepted as Phyllanthus parvulus Sond. var. garipensis (E.Mey. ex Drege) Radcl.-Sm. present
 Phyllanthus cedrelifolius I.Verd. accepted as Phyllanthus polyanthus Pax, present
 Phyllanthus delagoensis Hutch. indigenous
 Phyllanthus fraternus G.L.Webster, not indigenous, naturalised
 Phyllanthus genistoides Sond. accepted as Phyllanthus incurvus Thunb. present
 Phyllanthus glaucophyllus Sond. indigenous
 Phyllanthus graminicola Hutch. ex S.Moore, indigenous
 Phyllanthus heterophyllus E.Mey. ex Mull.Arg. indigenous
 Phyllanthus incurvus Thunb. indigenous
 Phyllanthus loandensis Welw. ex Mull.Arg. indigenous
 Phyllanthus macranthus Pax, indigenous
 Phyllanthus macranthus Pax var. macranthus, indigenous
 Phyllanthus maderaspatensis L. indigenous
 Phyllanthus meyerianus Mull.Arg. indigenous
 Phyllanthus myrtaceus Sond. indigenous
 Phyllanthus nummulariifolius Poir. indigenous
 Phyllanthus nummulariifolius Poir. var. nummulariifolius, indigenous
 Phyllanthus omahakensis Dinter & Pax, indigenous
 Phyllanthus parvulus Sond. indigenous
 Phyllanthus parvulus Sond. var. garipensis (E.Mey. ex Drege) Radcl.-Sm. indigenous
 Phyllanthus parvulus Sond. var. parvulus, indigenous
 Phyllanthus pentandrus Schumach. & Thonn. indigenous
 Phyllanthus pinnatus (Wight) G.L.Webster, indigenous
 Phyllanthus polyanthus Pax, indigenous
 Phyllanthus polyspermus Schumach. indigenous
 Phyllanthus reticulatus Poir. indigenous
 Phyllanthus reticulatus Poir. var. reticulatus, indigenous
 Phyllanthus tenellus Roxb. var. garipensis (E.Mey. ex Drege) Mull.Arg. accepted as Phyllanthus parvulus Sond. var. garipensis (E.Mey. ex Drege) Radcl.-Sm. present

Pseudolachnostylis
Genus Pseudolachnostylis:
 Pseudolachnostylis maprouneifolia Pax, indigenous
 Pseudolachnostylis maprouneifolia Pax var. dekindtii (Pax) Radcl.-Sm. indigenous
 Pseudolachnostylis maprouneifolia Pax var. glabra (Pax) Brenan, indigenous

Picrodendraceae
Family: Picrodendraceae,

Androstachys
Genus Androstachys:
 Androstachys johnsonii Prain, indigenous

Hyaenanche
Genus Hyaenanche:
 Hyaenanche globosa (Gaertn.) Lamb. & Vahl, endemic

Podostemaceae
Family: Podostemaceae,

Leiothylax
Genus Leiothylax:
 Leiothylax warmingii (Engl.) Warm. accepted as Letestuella tisserantii G.Taylor

Sphaerothylax
Genus Sphaerothylax:
 Sphaerothylax algiformis Bisch. ex C.Krauss, indigenous

Tristicha
Genus Tristicha:
 Tristicha trifaria (Bory ex Willd.) Spreng. indigenous
 Tristicha trifaria (Bory ex Willd.) Spreng. subsp. trifaria, indigenous

Putranjivaceae
Family: Putranjivaceae,

Drypetes
Genus Drypetes:
 Drypetes arguta (Mull.Arg.) Hutch. indigenous
 Drypetes gerrardii Hutch. indigenous
 Drypetes gerrardii Hutch. var. gerrardii, indigenous
 Drypetes gerrardii Hutch. var. tomentosa Radcl.-Sm. indigenous
 Drypetes mossambicensis Hutch. indigenous
 Drypetes natalensis (Harv.) Hutch. indigenous
 Drypetes natalensis (Harv.) Hutch. var. natalensis, indigenous
 Drypetes reticulata Pax, indigenous

Rhizophoraceae
Family: Rhizophoraceae,

Bruguiera
Genus Bruguiera:
 Bruguiera gymnorhiza (L.) Lam. indigenous

Cassipourea
Genus Cassipourea:
 Cassipourea flanaganii (Schinz) Alston, endemic
 Cassipourea gerrardii (Schinz) Alston, accepted as Cassipourea malosana (Baker) Alston, present
 Cassipourea gummiflua Tul. indigenous
 Cassipourea gummiflua Tul. var. verticillata (N.E.Br.) J.Lewis, indigenous
 Cassipourea malosana (Baker) Alston, indigenous
 Cassipourea mossambicensis (Brehmer) Alston, indigenous
 Cassipourea swaziensis Compton, indigenous

Ceriops
Genus Ceriops:
 Ceriops tagal (Perr.) C.B.Rob. indigenous

Rhizophora
Genus Rhizophora:
 Rhizophora mucronata Lam. indigenous

Salicaceae
Family: Salicaceae,

Casearia
Genus Casearia:
 Casearia gladiiformis Mast. indigenous

Dovyalis
Genus Dovyalis:
 Dovyalis caffra (Hook.f. & Harv.) Warb. indigenous
 Dovyalis longispina (Harv.) Warb. indigenous
 Dovyalis lucida Sim, indigenous
 Dovyalis revoluta J.E.Thom, accepted as Dovyalis zeyheri (Sond.) Warb. present
 Dovyalis rhamnoides (Burch. ex DC.) Burch. & Harv. indigenous
 Dovyalis rotundifolia (Thunb.) Thunb. & Harv. endemic
 Dovyalis zeyheri (Sond.) Warb. indigenous

Flacourtia
Genus Flacourtia:
 Flacourtia indica (Burm.f.) Merr. indigenous

Homalium
Genus Homalium:
 Homalium dentatum (Harv.) Warb. indigenous
 Homalium rufescens Benth. endemic
 Homalium subsuperum Sprague, accepted as Homalium dentatum (Harv.) Warb. present

Oncoba
Genus Oncoba:
 Oncoba spinosa Forssk. indigenous
 Oncoba spinosa Forssk. subsp. spinosa, indigenous

Populus
Genus Populus:
 Populus alba L. not indigenous, naturalised, invasive
 Populus alba L. var. alba, not indigenous, naturalised
 Populus canescens (Aiton) Sm. not indigenous, naturalised, invasive
 Populus deltoides Bartram ex Marshall subsp. deltoides, not indigenous, naturalised, invasive
 Populus nigra L. not indigenous, naturalised
 Populus nigra L. var. italica Munchh. not indigenous, naturalised, invasive

Pseudoscolopia
Genus Pseudoscolopia:
 Pseudoscolopia polyantha Gilg, endemic

Salix
Genus Salix:
 Salix babylonica L. not indigenous, naturalised, invasive
 Salix babylonica L. var. babylonica, not indigenous, naturalised
 Salix caprea L. not indigenous, naturalised, invasive
 Salix mucronata Thunb. indigenous
 Salix mucronata Thunb. subsp. capensis (Thunb.) Immelman, accepted as Salix mucronata Thunb. subsp. mucronata, present
 Salix mucronata Thunb. subsp. hirsuta (Thunb.) Immelman, endemic
 Salix mucronata Thunb. subsp. mucronata, indigenous
 Salix mucronata Thunb. subsp. wilmsii (Seemen) Immelman, accepted as Salix mucronata Thunb. subsp. woodii (Seemen) Immelman, present
 Salix mucronata Thunb. subsp. woodii (Seemen) Immelman, indigenous
 Salix subserrata Willd. accepted as Salix mucronata Thunb. subsp. subserrata (Willd.) R.H.Archer & Jordaan 
 Salix x fragilis L. var. fragilis, not indigenous, naturalised, invasive

Scolopia
Genus Scolopia:
 Scolopia flanaganii (Bolus) Sim, endemic
 Scolopia mundii (Eckl. & Zeyh.) Warb. indigenous
 Scolopia oreophila (Sleumer) Killick, endemic
 Scolopia stolzii Gilg & Sleumer, indigenous
 Scolopia stolzii Gilg & Sleumer var. stolzii, indigenous
 Scolopia zeyheri (Nees) Harv. indigenous

Trimeria
Genus Trimeria:
 Trimeria grandifolia (Hochst.) Warb. indigenous
 Trimeria grandifolia (Hochst.) Warb. subsp. grandifolia, indigenous
 Trimeria trinervis Harv. endemic

Turneraceae
Family: Turneraceae,

Afroqueta
Genus Afroqueta:
 Afroqueta capensis (Harv.) Thulin & Razafim. indigenous

Piriqueta
Genus Piriqueta:
 Piriqueta capensis (Harv.) Urb. accepted as Afroqueta capensis (Harv.) Thulin & Razafim. indigenous

Streptopetalum
Genus Streptopetalum:
 Streptopetalum serratum Hochst. indigenous

Tricliceras
Genus Tricliceras:
 Tricliceras glanduliferum (Klotzsch) R.Fern. indigenous
 Tricliceras laceratum (Oberm.) Oberm. indigenous
 Tricliceras longepedunculatum (Mast.) R.Fern. indigenous
 Tricliceras longepedunculatum (Mast.) R.Fern. var. longepedunculatum, indigenous
 Tricliceras mossambicense (A.Fern. & R.Fern.) R.Fern. indigenous
 Tricliceras schinzii (Urb.) R.Fern. indigenous
 Tricliceras schinzii (Urb.) R.Fern. subsp. schinzii var. juttae, indigenous
 Tricliceras tanacetifolium (Klotzsch) R.Fern. indigenous

Violaceae
Family: Violaceae,

Hybanthus
Genus Hybanthus:
 Hybanthus capensis (Thunb.) Engl. indigenous
 Hybanthus densifolius Engl. indigenous
 Hybanthus enneaspermus (L.) F.Muell. not indigenous, naturalised
 Hybanthus enneaspermus (L.) F.Muell. var. caffer (Sond.) N.Robson, not indigenous, naturalised
 Hybanthus enneaspermus (L.) F.Muell. var. enneaspermus, not indigenous, naturalised
 Hybanthus enneaspermus (L.) F.Muell. var. serratus Engl. not indigenous, naturalised
 Hybanthus parviflorus (L.f.) Baill. not indigenous, naturalised

Rinorea
Genus Rinorea:
 Rinorea angustifolia (Thouars) Baill. indigenous
 Rinorea angustifolia (Thouars) Baill. subsp. natalensis (Engl.) Grey-Wilson, indigenous
 Rinorea domatiosa A.E.van Wyk, endemic
 Rinorea ilicifolia (Welw. ex Oliv.) Kuntze, indigenous
 Rinorea ilicifolia (Welw. ex Oliv.) Kuntze subsp. ilicifolia, indigenous
 Rinorea ilicifolia (Welw. ex Oliv.) Kuntze subsp. ilicifolia var. ilicifolia, indigenous

Viola
Genus Viola:
 Viola abyssinica Steud. ex Oliv. indigenous
 Viola arvensis Murray, not indigenous, naturalised
 Viola decumbens L.f. indigenous
 Viola decumbens L.f. var. decumbens, endemic
 Viola decumbens L.f. var. scrotiformis (DC.) Jessop, endemic
 Viola hederacea Labill. not indigenous, naturalised
 Viola priceana Pollard, not indigenous, naturalised
 Viola tricolor L. not indigenous, naturalised

References

South African plant biodiversity lists
Malpighiales